Theerpu is a 1982 Indian Tamil-language film, directed by R. Krishnamoorthy. The film stars Jaishankar, Sujatha, K. Balaji and Sivaji Ganesan. It is a remake of the Malayalam film Ithihasam. The film become a blockbuster at the box-office, running for over 100 days in theaters.

Plot 
The film revolves around a family Sivaji ganesan (Rajashekar who is a Superintendent of Police) where a man lives happily with his wife, two sons (a Lawyer and an Inspector) and a daughter. Things get worse when his daughter gets raped by a smuggler owing to a revenge. He immediately kills him after seeing his daughter in such a state.

He gets arrested by his own son for committing murder. His other son, the lawyer, tries to prove him innocent. During investigations, he doesn't reveal the real cause fearing his daughter's reputation. What happens next is the rest of the film.

Cast 
Sivaji Ganeshan
Sujatha
Jai Shankar
K. Balaji
Sarath Babu
Vijayakumar
Manorama
R. N. Sudarshan
Silk Smitha

Soundtrack 
Soundtrack was composed by M. S. Viswanathan and lyrics were by Vaali.

References

External links 
 

1980s Tamil-language films
1982 films
Films scored by M. S. Viswanathan
Tamil remakes of Malayalam films
Films directed by R. Krishnamoorthy